William Bailey (died 1409) was a draper and a Member of Parliament for Salisbury in 1406. He was elected to serve in the Parliament of 1410, but died in November 1409, before the Parliament assembled. It is not known if a replacement was elected.

References

14th-century births
1409 deaths
Year of birth missing
15th-century English people
Members of Parliament for Salisbury
English MPs 1406